Amar Singh Billing (born 10 January 1944) is an Indian former cyclist. He competed in three events at the 1964 Summer Olympics.

References

External links
 

1944 births
Living people
Sportspeople from Patiala
Indian male cyclists
Olympic cyclists of India
Cyclists at the 1964 Summer Olympics